Roest is a Dutch toponymic surname. Roest is an archaic term for a reed bed, indicating an ancestor living in or nearby one. People with this surname include:

Elbert Roest (born 1954), Dutch politician and historian
Meyer Roest (1821–1889), Dutch bibliographer
Nikki de Roest born 1993), Dutch football midfielder
Niklas Roest (born 1986), Norwegian hockey player
Patrick Roest (born 1995), Dutch speed skater
Robert Roest (born 1969), Dutch football defender
Stacy Roest (born 1974), Canadian hockey player
Theodorus Marinus Roest (1832–1898), Dutch naturalist
Theodorus Marinus Roest van Limburg (1806–1887), Dutch journalist

See also
Roost (disambiguation)
Rost, German surname
Røst, Norwegian island municipality

References

Dutch-language surnames
Toponymic surnames